The Holden Commodore (VC) is a mid-size car that was produced by Holden, from 1980 to 1981. It was the second iteration of the first generation of the Holden Commodore.

Overview 
The VC Commodore was launched on 30 March 1980 and is primarily distinguished by its "eggcrate" style grille. This series brought many improvements over the VB Commodore and maintained the Commodore's place as the best selling car in Australia. It was replaced by the VH series in October 1981.

The improvements included revised suspension to improve ride and handling, a few cosmetic changes and the availability of new options such as cruise control.

However, one of the biggest changes were a series of engine upgrades which included redesigned cylinder heads, now with a single intake and exhaust port for every cylinder, improved intake/exhaust manifolds, new camshafts and pistons and an all-new carburettor called the Rochester Varajet, as well as the fitment of electronic ignition. In total, these upgrades brought up to 25 percent more power and 15 percent better fuel efficiency. The engine block on these motors were painted a blue colour (as opposed to the previous red) and were commonly referred to as the Blue motor.

As well as changes to the existing engines, a new 1.9-litre inline-four engine was introduced. Known as the Starfire four, the new engine was the 2.85-litre blue inline-six engine with two cylinders removed. Also used in the UC Sunbird, this engine was fitted to the Commodore in response to increasing pressure from the 1979 energy crisis. This new engine was not a complete success however, as its lack of power meant the engine needed to be pushed hard to deliver acceptable performance, negating any fuel saving benefits.

The engines used in this generation were Holden's own, and were not shared with the equivalent  Opel Rekord or Vauxhall Carlton.

A new specification level was added to the range: the L, to replace the unbadged base model. The mid-range SL and SL/E flagship trim levels from the VB continued on. Transmission choices remained the same as the VB Commodore. A total of 121,807 VC Commodores were produced.

With the discontinuation of the Holden HZ models in 1980, the Commodore was complemented by a range of Holden WB commercial vehicles and the Statesman WB luxury models. All of these also utilised the "Blue" motors.

HDT Commodore 
In late 1979, Holden pulled out of touring car racing after two years of domination by the LX Torana A9X SS hatchback. In 1980, this led to Peter Brock buying the Holden Dealer Team (HDT), though without Holden funding was needed to continue racing and development. This led to the creation of a modified VC Commodore, tuned and styled under the direction of Peter Brock who established HDT Special Vehicles, not only to produce enhanced versions of the Commodore but as a way of funding the race team. The result was a luxury-performance version of the VC Commodore, to be sold through select Holden dealers throughout Australia as the HDT Commodore. The HDT Commodore was powered by an HDT tuned 5.0-litre V8 engine, producing  at 4500 rpm. The HDT Commodore was a limited edition vehicle, with exactly 500 production models produced. These only sold with a choice of three colours (Palais White, Firethorn Red or Tuxedo Black) to pay homage to Marlboro, HDT's main sponsor at the time.

References

External links 
 

VC
Cars introduced in 1980
Cars of Australia
Mid-size cars
Rear-wheel-drive vehicles
Sedans
Station wagons
Cars discontinued in 1981